Amyloid light-chain (AL) amyloidosis, also known as primary amyloidosis, is the most common form of systemic amyloidosis in the US. The disease is caused when a person's antibody-producing cells do not function properly and produce abnormal protein fibers made of components of antibodies called light chains. These light chains come together to form amyloid deposits which can cause serious damage to different organs. Abnormal light chains in urine are sometimes referred to as "Bence Jones protein".

Signs and symptoms
AL amyloidosis can affect a wide range of organs, and consequently present with a range of symptoms. The kidneys are the most commonly affected organ in AL amyloidosis. Symptoms of kidney disease and kidney failure can include fluid retention, swelling, and shortness of breath.

In addition to kidneys, AL amyloidosis may affect the heart, peripheral nervous system, gastrointestinal tract, blood, lungs and skin. Heart complications, which affect more than a third of AL patients, include heart failure and irregular heart beat. Other symptoms can include stroke, gastrointestinal disorders, enlarged liver, diminished spleen function, diminished function of the adrenal and other endocrine glands, skin color change or growths, lung problems, bleeding and bruising problems, fatigue, and weight loss.

Causes
AL amyloidosis is caused by the deposition of abnormal antibody free light chains.  The abnormal light chains are produced by monoclonal plasma cells, and, although AL amyloidosis can occur without diagnosis of another disorder, it is often associated with other plasma cell disorders, such as multiple myeloma and Waldenström's macroglobulinemia. About 10% to 15% of patients with multiple myeloma may develop overt AL amyloidosis.

Diagnosis
Both blood and the urine can be tested for the light chains,  which may form amyloid deposits, causing disease.  However, the diagnosis requires a sample of an affected organ. Other diagnosis can be tissue biopsy. Tissue biopsy tests a tissue sample to look for amyloid deposits. The tissue is stained with red dye, and under a microscopic examination, amyloid proteins can be detected if the tissue turns an apple-green color.

Treatment
The most effective treatment is autologous bone marrow transplants with stem cell rescues. However many patients are too weak to tolerate this approach.

Other treatments can involve application of chemotherapy similar to that used in multiple myeloma. A combination of  melphalan and dexamethasone has been found effective in those who are ineligible for stem cell transplantation, and a combination of bortezomib and dexamethasone is now in widespread clinical use.

Prognosis
Median survival for patients diagnosed with AL amyloidosis was 13 months in the early 1990s, but had improved to  months a decade later.

Epidemiology
AL amyloidosis is a rare disease; only 1200 to 3200 new cases are reported each year in the United States. Two thirds of patients with AL amyloidosis are male and less than 5% of patients are under 40 years of age.

See also
Light chain deposition disease

References

External links 

Amyloidosis